Harriet "Hattie" Alexandra Emily Taylor (born 12 February 1994) is a British rower.

Early life and education
Taylor was born in February 1994 to Andrew and Helen Taylor of Sunningdale, England. She attended the Sir William Perkins's School in Chertsey, Surrey, England. After receiving only a few offers after high school, She headed to Melbourne University Boat club in Australia, where she met with Syracuse coaches and made her way to Syracuse, New York.

She joined Syracuse rowing in 2013 and graduated with a degree in Political Science in 2017.

Career
Taylor was on the Great Britain’s U-23 team, winning a bronze medal at the World Rowing Championships in 2015.

She won a silver medal in the eight at the 2019 European Rowing Championships. In 2021, she won a European bronze medal in the coxless four in Varese, Italy.

Taylor and the Great Britain team finished fourth in the coxless four event in the Tokyo 2020 Olympics.

References

External links

Harriet Taylor at British Rowing
Syracuse Rowing Bio

Living people
1994 births
British female rowers
Olympic rowers of Great Britain
Rowers at the 2020 Summer Olympics
Syracuse University alumni
Syracuse Orange rowers
People educated at Sir William Perkins's School